Hometown, HomeTown, or Home Town may refer to:
A hometown, the town where someone lives or the town that they come from, typically their place of birth.
In developing nations particularly: native place, village of origin in newly urbanized societies.

Film and television
 Hometown (film), a 1983 Japanese film
 Hometown (American TV series), a 1985 American comedy-drama adapted from the 1983 film The Big Chill
 Home Town (TV series), an American home-renovation series
 Hometown (South Korean TV series), a 2021 television series

Music

Groups
 HomeTown (band), a 2010s Irish boy band
 The Hometown Band, a 1970s Canadian band

Albums
 Hometown!, by the Dubliners, 1972
 Hometown (Asian Kung-Fu Generation album) or the title song, 2018
 HomeTown (HomeTown album), 2015
 Hometown (Hush album), 1998
 Hometown (Ten Second Epic album), 2009
 Hometowns, by the Rural Alberta Advantage, 2008

Songs
 "Home Town" (song), by Joe Jackson, 1986
 "Hometown" (Sheppard song), 2018
 "Hometown", by Andy Burrows from Company, 2012
 "Hometown", by Cleopatrick from The Boys, 2018
 "Hometown", by Diplo from Diplo Presents Thomas Wesley, Chapter 1: Snake Oil, 2020
 "Hometown", by Kane Brown from Kane Brown, 2016
 "Hometown", by Miss Kittin and The Hacker, 2007
 "Hometown", by Neffex, 2017
 "Hometown", by Sea Girls, 2021
 "Hometown", by Twenty One Pilots from Blurryface, 2015

Places 
 Hometown, Illinois, US
 Hometown, Pennsylvania, US
 Hometown, West Virginia, US

Other uses 
 AOL Hometown, a defunct web-hosting service
 HomeTown, an Indian furniture retailer owned by Future Group

See also